Yaakov Elman (1943 – July 29, 2018) was an American professor of Talmud at Yeshiva University's Bernard Revel Graduate School of Jewish Studies where he held the Herbert S. and Naomi Denenberg Chair in Talmudic Studies. He was the founder of the field now known as Irano-Talmudica, which seeks to understand the Babylonian Talmud in its Middle-Persian context.

Education 
Elman received his MA in Assyriology from Columbia University and his PhD in Talmud from New York University.

Publications 

Authored:

 Authority and Tradition: Toseftan Baraitot in Talmudic Babylonia
 The Living Nach: The Early Prophets, The Later Prophets
 Reading the Hebrew Bible: Two Millennia of Jewish Biblical Commentary

Edited:

 Transmitting Jewish Traditions: Orality, Textuality, and Cultural Diffusion (Studies in Jewish Culture and Society)
 Dream Interpretation from Classical Jewish Sources
 Immortality, Resurrection and the Age of the Universe: A Kabbalistic View
 Why Jews Do What They Do: The History of Jewish Customs Throughout the Cycle of the Jewish Year
Hazon Nahum: Studies in Jewish Law, Thought, and History

Research interests 
His research interests centered around Talmud and rabbinic literature of nearly all periods and genres, including rabbinic theology, unfolding systems of rabbinic legal exegesis, and the cultural context of classical rabbinic texts. He researched the relation of the Babylonian Jewish community of Talmudic times to the surrounding Middle Persian culture and religions.

See also 
 David Bashevkin

1943 births
2018 deaths
20th-century American Jews
21st-century American Jews
Yeshiva University faculty
People from Brooklyn